Moment to Moment is an album by Art Farmer and Benny Golson's group, The Jazztet recorded in Italy in 1983 and originally released on the Soul Note label.

Reception

Allmusic awarded the album 4½ stars.

Track listing
All compositions by Benny Golson except as indicated
 "Moment to Moment" - 8:50
 "Along Came Betty" - 6:45
 "Farmer's Market" (Art Farmer) - 5:32
 "Fair Weather" - 5:50
 "Yesterday's Thoughts" - 8:21
 "Ease Away Walk" - 8:21

Personnel
Art Farmer - flugelhorn, trumpet
Benny Golson - tenor saxophone
Curtis Fuller - trombone
Mickey Tucker - piano
Ray Drummond - bass 
Albert Heath - drums

References 

Black Saint/Soul Note albums
Art Farmer albums
Benny Golson albums
1983 albums